Seyyed Mohammadi Ali Mosavi (born 1952) is an Iranian Shiite cleric and politician.

Mosavi was born in Qom. He is a member of the 4th, 5th and 9th Islamic Consultative Assembly from the electorate of Khodabandeh. Mosavi won with 41,741 (42.94%) votes.

References

People from Qom
Deputies of Khodabandeh
Living people
1952 births
Members of the 9th Islamic Consultative Assembly
Members of the 5th Islamic Consultative Assembly
Members of the 4th Islamic Consultative Assembly